Apar may refer to:
 Apar (album), an album by Spanish dance band Delorean
 , an Empire F type coaster in service with Gaselee & Son Ltd, London, 1960–74.
 Southern three-banded armadillo, a species of armadillo

APAR may refer to:
 Active Phased Array Radar, a shipborne multi-function radar
 Authorized Program Analysis Report, in IBM nomenclature, a problem officially recognized and diagnosed by IBM's support department.

See also 
 Appar, 7th-century Tamil poet-saint